Opacity family porins are a family of porins from pathogenic Neisseria. 
These bacteria possess a repertoire of phase-variable opacity proteins that mediate various pathogen/host cell interactions. These proteins are related to OmpA-like transmembrane domain family.

References

Protein domains
Protein families
Outer membrane proteins